The 1975 Grand Prix motorcycle racing season was the 27th F.I.M. Road Racing World Championship season.

Season summary
1975 represented a changing of the guard in Grand Prix motorcycle racing, both for riders as well as machines. Giacomo Agostini would claim his final 500cc World Championship aboard a Yamaha two-stroke machine. This would also mark the first time a two-stroke machine had won the premier division.

Angel Nieto claimed his fourth world title for Kreidler in the 50cc class. In the 125cc division, the Morbidellis of Pileri and Bianchi dominated, finishing first and second in six of the ten events. Despite Michel Rougerie scoring more points, his Harley-Davidson teammate Walter Villa would take the 250cc title because of the "best of six finishes" rule. Nineteen-year-old newcomer Johnny Cecotto made an impressive debut at the season opening French Grand Prix where, he won the 250cc and 350cc races. He went on to claim the 350cc title, becoming the youngest-ever FIM World Champion at the time.

In the premier division, MV Agusta with Phil Read aboard, refused to go down easily. The Championship was not resolved until the tenth and final round in Czechoslovakia, when Agostini emerged triumphant to claim his fifteenth world title and the first in the premier 500cc class for a two-stroke motorcycle. Barry Sheene would also serve notice that he was an up and comer with victories at Assen and Sweden. The writing was on the wall for four-stroke machinery as eight of the top ten riders in the points standings were aboard two-stroke machines.

1975 Grand Prix season calendar

Participants

500cc participants

Final standings

Scoring system
Points were awarded to the top ten finishers in each race. Only the best of five races were counted on 50cc and Sidecars championships, while in the 125cc, 250cc, 350cc and 500cc championships, the best of seven races were counted.

500cc standings
{|
|

350cc standings
{|
|

250cc standings

125cc standings

50cc standings
{|
|

References

 Büla, Maurice & Schertenleib, Jean-Claude (2001). Continental Circus 1949-2000. Chronosports S.A.

External links

Grand Prix motorcycle racing seasons